Turanian is an obsolete language-family proposal subsuming most of the languages of Eurasia not included in Indo-European, Semitic and Chinese.
During the 19th century, inspired by the establishment of the Indo-European family, scholars looked for similarly widespread families elsewhere.
Building on the work of predecessors such as Rasmus Rask and Matthias Castrén, Max Müller proposed the Turanian grouping primarily on the basis of the incidence of agglutinative morphology, naming it after Turan, an ancient Persian term for the lands of Central Asia.
The languages he included are now generally assigned to nine separate language families.

Classification
Müller viewed the structure of the family as follows:
 Northern Division (Ural-Altaic)
 Tungusic
 Mongolic
 Turkic
 Samoyedic
 Finnic
 Southern Division
 Taic
 Malaic (Malayo-Polynesian)
 Bhotîya (Tibeto-Burman)
 Gangetic
 Lohitic
 Munda
 Tamulic (Dravidian)

He left Japonic, Koreanic, Koryak, Itelmen and various languages of the Caucasus unclassified, but suggested that they might have a common origin with Turanian.

Linguists no longer consider typological features a sufficient criterion for the identification of language families.
Müller's northern division, Ural-Altaic, was widely accepted for some time,
but largely abandoned early in the 20th century.
The combination of the Samoyedic and Finnic (Finno-Ugric) classes form the modern Uralic family.
The Altaic theory linking Tungusic, Mongolic and Turkic is also rejected by most scholars.
Each of the five classes of his southern division are now considered to belong to separate language families, Tai–Kadai, Austronesian, Sino-Tibetan, Austroasiatic and Dravidian respectively.

References

Works cited 
 
 
 
 

Proposed language families